Major-General Sir Martin Spencer White, KCVO, CB, CBE, CStJ (born 25 March 1944) is a senior British Army officer who served as Lord Lieutenant of the Isle of Wight from 2006 to 2019; he had previously been Vice-Lieutenant since 1999. He stepped down as Lord Lieutenant in March 2019.

He was commissioned into the Royal Army Service Corps in 1964 and, among other units, he commanded the Logistic Support Group between 1987 and 1989 and the Force Maintenance Area during the Gulf War (1990–91); he was Director of Support for the Allied Land Forces Central Europe from 1993 to 1995 (he was also promoted to Major-General in 1993), and Director-General of Logistic Support for the British Army from 1995 to 1998. He also served as Colonel Commandant of the Royal Logistic Corps from 1998 to 2009, and has worked in advisory roles for various private sector companies since 1999. In 1991, he was appointed a Commander of the Order of the British Empire, and seven years later a Companion of the Order of the Bath; in the 2018 Birthday Honours he was also appointed a Knight Commander of the Royal Victorian Order.

References 

Living people
1944 births
Royal Army Service Corps officers
Lord Lieutenants of the Isle of Wight
Knights Commander of the Royal Victorian Order
Companions of the Order of the Bath
Commanders of the Order of the British Empire
Royal Corps of Transport officers
Royal Logistic Corps officers
British Army major generals
British Army personnel of the Gulf War